The Pioneers , also known as  Pioneers , is a bronze sculpture in Central Park in  Elmwood, Illinois. The sculpture is one of several works by Lorado Taft in Elmwood, his birthplace. Taft was a prominent Chicago-based sculptor with a national reputation for his monuments and fountains, including works designed for the 1893 Columbian Exposition. He donated The Pioneers to Elmwood under the condition that the city pay for its casting and mounting.

The family is looking westward, symbolizing the pioneers' westward expansion, and the figures reflect the Midwestern realism of Taft's earlier works rather than the Renaissance-inspired idealism of his later sculptures. The sculpture was dedicated on May 27, 1928, and a public ceremony was held for the occasion. The inscription below the statue reads:

WHO BRIDGED THE STREAMSSUBDUED THE SOIL ANDFOUNDED A STATE

The sculpture was listed on the National Register of Historic Places on May 4, 2001.

References

Elmwood, Illinois
Sculptures by Lorado Taft
1928 sculptures
National Register of Historic Places in Peoria County, Illinois
Outdoor sculptures in Illinois
Bronze sculptures in Illinois
Monuments and memorials on the National Register of Historic Places in Illinois
Works about human migration
Statues in Illinois
Sculptures of men in Illinois
Sculptures of women in Illinois
1928 establishments in Illinois
Sculptures of children in the United States